The 2021 West Bengal Legislative Assembly election for 292 of the 294 constituencies in West Bengal was held between 27 March to 29 April 2021 in eight phases. Voting for the two remaining constituencies was delayed to 30 September 2021.

The incumbent All India Trinamool Congress government led by Mamata Banerjee won the election by a landslide, despite opinion polls generally predicting a close race against the Bharatiya Janata Party, which became the official opposition with 77 seats. The Indian Secular Front won one seat, and the Indian National Congress and the left parties did not win any seats.

Background

Electoral system 
Outlined in Article 168 of the Constitution of India, the West Bengal Legislative Assembly is the only house of the unicameral legislature of West Bengal, not a permanent body, and subject to dissolution. The assembly term lasts for five years unless it is dissolved earlier. Members of the Legislative Assembly are directly elected by the people, and the tenure of the Sixteenth West Bengal Legislative Assembly was scheduled to end on 30 May 2021.

Previous general election 
In the 2016 election, the All India Trinamool Congress (AITC or TMC) retained its majority in the Legislative Assembly with 211 seats. The Indian National Congress won 44 seats and the Left Front won 33 seats from their alliance, while the Bharatiya Janata Party and the Gorkha Janmukti Morcha won 3 seats each out of the total 294 seats.

Political developments 
Since the by-elections held for the Contai South seat in 2017, it became evident that the Bharatiya Janata Party (BJP) had overtaken the Left Front as the primary opposition party in the state. According to various political analysts, the shifting of the Left Front and other opposition voters towards the BJP caused the party's vote share to significantly increase. In spite of widespread violence, the BJP emerged as the second largest party in the 2018 elections to the state panchayats mainly due to the shifting of the Left Front's voter base.

In the 2019 general elections, the BJP increased its number of Lok Sabha seats from 2 to 18, and took 40% of the vote share, an increase from 11% in the 2016 elections. Trinamool Congress (TMC) was reduced from 34 to 22 seats, Indian National Congress (INC) was reduced from 4 to 2 seats, and the Left Front did not win any seats. Public anger towards the alleged corruption and hooliganism of a section of TMC cadres in rural areas during the 2018 panchayat elections, religious polarisation by BJP fueled by resentment of a section of Bengali Hindu society towards Mamata Banerjee's alleged tactics of Muslim appeasement, and large scale support of the Rajbongshi and Matua communities for granting Indian citizenship to exclusively non-Muslim Bangladeshi immigrants have been cited as important reasons behind the rise of BJP in West Bengal alongside the decline of Left Front.

With Narendra Modi becoming the only non-Congress prime minister to remain in power for two consecutive terms (amounting to ten years) without depending on the support of the National Democratic Alliance, and the BJP fulfilling the wish of its founder Shyamaprasad Mukherjee by revoking the special status of Jammu and Kashmir and long standing promise of resolving the Ayodhya dispute in favour of Hindus, the party considered the formation of a BJP-led state government in West Bengal for the first time as a means of paying homage to Syama Prasad Mukherjee, who hailed from there. A BJP victory in West Bengal would have also demoralised Mamata Banerjee's attempts of creating a non-BJP non-Congress alliance of regional parties that might play an important role in the upcoming general elections.

BJP increased their seats in the assembly from 3 to 53 when the West Bengal Legislative Assembly was dissolved through defections from TMC, INC, and Left Front leaders, and by-elections from 2016 to 2021. A prominent defector in December 2020 was Suvendu Adhikari, who was a long-time associate of Mamata Banerjee, and a state cabinet minister who was dissatisfied over the rising influence of her nephew Abhishek Banerjee in the party. However, Adhikari revealed that he was in contact with the BJP since 2014 after he joined the party. His father Sisir Adhikari, the MP from Kanthi, also defected from TMC to BJP. Another cabinet minister, Rajib Banerjee, also joined BJP.

However, the TMC won the Kharagpur Sadar seat from BJP and Kaliaganj seat from the INC, while retaining the Karimpur seat in the by-polls held later in 2019 after Abhishek Banerjee employed Prashant Kishor as the election strategist of Trinamool Congress for the upcoming polls. Elections to municipal bodies of West Bengal (which include 112 municipalities and the municipal corporations of Kolkata, Howrah, Bidhannagar, Chandannagar, Asansol and Siliguri) could not be held as scheduled in 2020 due to the COVID-19 pandemic in India.

Political issues

COVID-19 

The pandemic became an election issue. The government was accused of "fudging" the count of positive cases and deaths in the region, and the AITC-led state government and BJP-led union government blamed each other for the surge in COVID-19 infections over the course of the campaign.

The BJP accused Mamata Banerjee of not attending COVID-19 emergency management meetings held during the months of election campaigning, despite the second wave of infections, and for also holding election rallies. Sanjukta Morcha held the first Brigade rally ahead of polling in West Bengal. In mid-April, TMC requested holding the remaining phases of the elections in a single phase amid the rising number of COVID cases, but it was rejected by the Election Commission of India (ECI).

Cyclone Amphan

In May 2020, a year before the 2021 elections, Cyclone Amphan hit the state. After it passed, widespread allegations of mismanagement and relief scam were reported. Protests broke out in some districts over the allegations, and the opposition made it an election issue ahead of the Assembly polls.

Citizenship, immigration and refugee issues 
In 2019, the BJP-led Union Government passed the CAA in Parliament, promising citizenship to immigrants and refugees belonging to religious minorities in Bangladesh, and providing them with rehabilitation. The BJP's Bengali booklet released in January 2020 claimed that the National Register of Citizens was implemented to identify allegedly undocumented illegal Muslim immigrants, but religiously persecuted Hindus, Sikhs, Buddhists, Christians, Jains, Parsi, and other religious minorities would be "shielded" by the CAA.

Other issues 
Polarisation amongst various religious, linguistic, and caste communities were also likely to play a role in this election. Both TMC and BJP had promised schemes for various communities. Although previously mobilized by Left governments against elites under the "class" narrative, the Dalits of West Bengal began to assert their identity politically. Religious polarization is particularly intense in districts bordering Bangladesh, such as North 24 Parganas. Arguments regarding who are native to the state and constituencies were also likely to impact the elections. Dissatisfaction and defection of many TMC leaders to BJP, allegedly due to rising influence of Abhishek Banerjee and Kishor in party administration was also likely to impact the elections.

An event was organised by the Ministry of Cultural Affairs in Kolkata's Victoria Memorial to commemorate Netaji Subhas Chandra Bose's 125th birth anniversary, which was attended by PM Narendra Modi and CM Mamata Banerjee among others. A large number of BJP activists were present in the crowd. Just as Banerjee got up to speak, BJP supporters started chanting "Jai Shri Ram" which prompted the CM to abandon her speech. This incident led to a political slugfest between the BJP and the TMC ahead of the upcoming elections. Meanwhile, Bengal BJP president Dilip Ghosh made controversial remarks about Netaji. Mamata claimed that the BJP had "insulted Netaji and Bengal" by their actions. The BJP leadership criticised Banerjee while the Left Front and the Congress backed her and condemned the BJP for the incident of Victoria Memorial. Not only political personalities but also non-political people from different levels of the society, including Netaji's grandnephew Sugata Bose, condemned the incident of chanting religiopolitical slogans by BJP supporters which was unlikely for an apolitical event dedicated to Netaji.

Schedule

The election schedule was announced on 26 February 2021, and the election was held in eight phases from 27 March 2021 to 29 April 2021. Votes were counted on 2 May 2021. On the day of announcement, the ECI declared that physically disabled and elderly voters would get the benefit of postal voting and the time limit for voting was extended by one hour. Due to polling abnormalities, re-polling for booth number 88 in Jangipara was held in the fourth phase. The elections in Jangipur and Samserganj were adjourned due to the death of the INC candidate in Samserganj and Revolutionary Socialist Party (RSP) candidate in Jangipur. Polling for these two seats was originally rescheduled to 13 May 2021, but as that day was Eid, it was pushed back to 16 May. Later on ECI adjourned polling for both constituencies and it took place on 30 September. Repolling at the Amtali Madhyamik Siksha Kendra polling station in Sitalkuchi was conducted on 29 April, after CISF personnel were fired on 10 April.

Parties and alliances

All India Trinamool Congress + 

Both factions of the Gorkha Janmukti Morcha (GJM) expressed support for TMC in the assembly election. TMC allotted three seats in the Darjeeling to GJM, but its two factions, namely Bimal and Binoy, declared fielding their candidates in each of the three seats. RJD, Shiv Sena, and JMM also endorsed Trinamool for the election. TMC supported Independent candidate in Joypur after their candidate's nomination was cancelled.

Sanjukta Morcha 

On 28 January 2021 Congress leader Adhir Ranjan Chowdhury announced that seat-sharing talks between the Congress and Left Front had concluded for 193 seats and that the remaining 101 seats would be decided at a later point. Out of the 193 seats agreed upon by 28 January 92 went to Congress and 101 to the Left Front. Left Congress and ISF announced that they would form an alliance called Sanyukta Morcha on 28 February 2021. ISF initially claimed that they secured 30 seats from the Left Front's quota. After the final seat sharing agreement was concluded, it was announced that the Left Front would contest 165 seats, Congress 92 seats, and ISF 37 seats.

Left Front chairman Biman Bose announced the candidates for the first and second-phase elections on 5 March alongside INC and ISF leaders, leaving seats for them in the list. INC revealed its first list of 13 candidates for the first two phases on 6 March. Left Front announced its second list of candidates on 10 March, consisting of several new and young faces from All India Students Federation (AISF), All India Youth Federation (AIYF), Students' Federation of India (SFI), and Democratic Youth Federation of India (DYFI), along with ex-ministers of the Left Front government and ex-MPs; Bose also nominated DYFI West Bengal state president Minakshi Mukherjee as the CPI(M) candidate for the Nandigram seat, which was kept vacant in the first list published on 5 March. On 14 March, INC revealed their second list of 34 candidates on 14 March, and ISF their first set of 20 candidates. Sanyukta Morcha announced 15 more candidates on 17 March consisting of 9 from the Left Front, 2 from INC, and 4 from ISF. INC revealed their third list of 39 candidates on 20 March, and two more on 22 March.

National Democratic Alliance 

Five hill-based parties pledged support to BJP ahead of the assembly election: Gorkha National Liberation Front (GNLF), Communist Party of Revolutionary Marxists, Akhil Bharatiya Gorkha League (ABGL), Gorkhaland Rajya Nirman Morcha, and SUMETI Mukti Morcha. Hindu Samhati, a right-wing organisation in West Bengal, had withdrawn their support from the BJP at first to contest the elections on their own, but eventually they supported the BJP. BJP allotted the Amta constituency seat to the president of Hindu Samhati to contest under the symbol of BJP.

BJP also allotted the Baghmundi constituency, bordering Jharkhand, to the All Jharkhand Students Union (AJSU).

Others 
Shiv Sena initially said that they would contest in around 100 seats, but later on 4 March 2021 announced that they would not contest and would support Mamata Banerjee and TMC.

Candidates

Surveys and polls

Exit poll 
On 27 March, the ECI banned the publication of surveys and exit polls until 7:30 pm on 29 April to prevent influencing voters, but the ban ended half an hour earlier.

NK Digital Magazine exit poll predicted victory for TMC in general election for the Samserganj seat and by-election for the Bhabanipur seat. Ekhon Biswa Bangla Sangbad predicted TMC's victory in all three seats where elections took place on 30 September.

Opinion poll 
A number of pre-poll surveys for the elections were published by different agencies and groups in the span of one year until 27 March. Most polls contradicted each other regarding the possible outcome.

NK Digital Magazine opinion poll predicted victory for TMC in Jangipur and Samserganj. They also conducted a pre-poll survey across poll-bound Assembly constituencies that predicted TMC's victory.

Election

COVID-19 guidelines
The ECI issued various health guidelines for conducting the elections, including the use of masks, sanitisation of the polling booths, use of thermal scanners before entering the polling booths, maintaining social distancing, and so forth. The maximum number of voters for each polling station was lowered to 1000 from 1500.

After COVID-19 cases increased in the state, the ECI issued warnings for all recognised state and national political parties to strictly follow COVID-19 guidelines, and banned all political rallies, public meetings, street plays and nukkad sabhas from 7 pm to 10 am starting from 16 April. On 22 April 2021, before the seventh and eighth phases of voting, the ECI forbade roadshows, and added that at most 500 people were allowed in public meetings. On 27 April, they issued a notification over banning victory processions on and after the day the votes were counted.

Security preparations

After several instances of violence, threats, and murders before the polls were announced, the ECI and the Home Ministry ordered twelve companies of Central Armed Police Forces (CAPF) to be deployed in West Bengal on 20 February. At least 125 more CAPF troops were dispatched to reach West Bengal on 25 February to focus on sensitive zones. 60 companies of the Central Reserve Police Force (CRPF), 30 companies of the Sashastra Seema Bal (SSB), 25 companies of the Border Security Force (BSF) and five companies each of the Central Industrial Security Force (CISF) and the Indo-Tibetan Border Police (ITBP). The total number of central forces rose to 725, before a final total of 1,000 companies after the third phase of polling.

In the second phase of election, Section 144 of the Code of Criminal Procedure was implemented across areas in the Tamluk and Haldia subdivisions. After the fourth phase of polling, the ECI deployed an extra 71 companies of central forces.

Voting

Voter turnout

Number of general voters: 73,294,980
Male voters: 37,366,306
Female voters: 35,927,084
Non-binary voters: 1,590
Number of service voters: 112,642
Overseas voters: 210
Total number of voters: 73,407,832
Polling stations: 101,916

Phases

Incidents
In February, Jakir Hossain, the MLA from Jangipur and Labour Minister of West Bengal, received serious injuries after bombs were thrown at him in the Nimtita railway station.
On their way to attend the Brigade rally of Sanjukta Morcha, ISF workers attacked TMC activists in Bhangar.
On 10 March, Mamata Banerjee filed her nomination at the Haldia sub-divisional office headquarters as the TMC candidate for Nandigram. Around 6:15 pm she was injured when she was leaving the Birulia market area of that constituency. She alleged that she was pushed by "four-five people" who manhandled her and slammed the door of her car on her foot. She was taken to SSKM Hospital in Kolkata for treatment. BJP MP Subramanian Swamy made a direct call to her office and inquired about her health before giving a statement wishing her good health. A day after being injured, Mamata Banerjee released a video message urging people and party workers to be calm and exercise restraint. Two days after being admitted, she was discharged at the TMC's multiple requests. She alleged that the attack was orchestrated by Adhikari, who denied the claim. Eyewitness Nitai Maity, a sweet shopkeeper, said "[t]he crowd was already there. But as soon as the car arrived, it was as if the area was flooded with people. There was a bit of pushing. In the meantime, Mamata Banerjee had just opened the front door of the car and had just stepped out. Suddenly there was a push from outside and the door closed. Mamata Banerjee suddenly fell to the ground with a severe leg injury." Medinipur DIG Kunal Agarwal, District Magistrate Bivu Goel, and Superintendent of Police Praveen Prakash went to Birulia Bazar, Nandigram, on Thursday morning to collect eyewitness statements before sending their report to the ECI, whose report on the incident officially ruled out any possibility of foul play and suspended two police officers for being absent from the chief minister's convoy of policemen meant to provide her safety. TMC and BJP workers clashed in front of the DM and the SP. Mamata Banerjee continued to campaign, and the BJP accused of her of trying to gain the voters' sympathy by flaunting her injured leg in an attempt to "[play] the victim card". Some self-proclaimed eyewitnesses claimed that the car door collided with an iron beam embedded on the road, but Firhad Hakim stated that it had no scratches. TMC leaders stated that most of those who were giving eyewitness statements were BJP staff members and asked, "If they are really 'eyewitnesses' then why did they go near the Chief Minister's convoy in that crowd (despite being workers of the BJP)?" Paritosh Jana, TMC President of the Birulia region, said, "The BJP had planted some drunken people into the crowd. They attacked the Chief Minister pretending to have a view of her. They pushed the Supremo when she opened the car's door and was about to step out. The CM did not name any political party. She had only spoken of miscreants. But the BJP is opposing in advance. (They are) giving slogans against the CM. We firmly believe that it is the work of the BJP. It's just like 'the loud voice of a thief's mother' (Bangla version of the proverb 'rogues supplant justice')."
On 15 March, Mamata Banerjee claimed that at a political rally in Balarampur that goons were entering through the border of Ajodhya Hills area. She accused the BJP of planning to loot votes by sending goons from outside by trains on the eve of the election in order to intimidate voters. On 23 March, she repeated these claims and made demands to seal the border areas. On 26 February, Kolkata TV had reported on BJP workers entering West Bengal from the Hindi Belt. Each of them was given 300 rupees per day. On 29 April, some miscreants with firearms were caught on Kolkata TV cameras in Birbhum. They claimed to be outsiders and said that they were hired to do this for 10,000 rupees.)
In Baruipur, a TMC activist was killed in clash with members of CPI(M) and ISF.
Before the first phase of election, an election vehicle was set on fire by two unknown men.
On 25 March, state BJP president Dilip Ghosh made derogatory comments against Mamata Banerjee from a political rally in Purulia for which he was issued a notice by the ECI. He raised questions on her character due to her unmarried status and stated that if she wants to flaunt her injured leg before the public, then she should wear bermuda shorts instead of a saree.
On 27 March, the day of first phase polling, TMC supporters protested outside booth 172 of Majna of the South Contai seat, alleging electronic voting machine malfunction. They alleged that casting a vote for TMC displayed the lotus sign of BJP. Similar allegations came from the closest booth to it.
Two security personnel were reportedly injured in Satsatmal village, Purba Medinipur district, in a firing and bombing incident during phase 1 of polling.
A BJP worker's dead body was found in Paschim Medinipur during the first phase of election. The ECI said that they did not find any political motive in his death.
Three TMC activists were injured in a blast in Bankura during the first phase of elections.
Three TMC workers were attacked in Boyal of Nandigram. One of them, Rabin Manna, was admitted to SSKM Hospital with serious injuries, and died on 9 April around 4:30 am at SSKM Hospital. On 31 March, Mamata Banerjee said that her car was attacked again in Nandigram a day ago when she visited Manna's house. She later claimed she was informed by Manna's wife that BJP-backed goons were threatening to abduct her daughter and they had to take refuge with a local minority family.
In Dantan, it was reported that the CPRF prevented people from voting. A complaint was lodged at a local police station that alleged that the CPRF were allowing BJP workers to stay in the booth and cast votes in their name.
While on an official visit to Bangladesh, Modi visited the birthplace of Harichand Thakur at Orakandi in the Gopalganj district in an attempt to woo the electorally influential Matua community of the state. Mamata Banerjee asserted his trip to Orakandi is a violation of the poll code.
On 28 March, the ECI stated that 56 bombs were seized from Narendrapur of South 24 Parganas district.
During the nomination filing by the BJP candidate in Bijpur, gunshots were fired and later clashes broke out between BJP and TMC staff.
On 30 March, Ashok Dinda, BJP's candidate from Moyna, Purba Medinipur, was attacked and his vehicle vandalised during a campaign. He claimed that hundreds of people wielding lathi and rods hurled stones at his vehicle. Dinda's shoulder was injured.
On 2 April, the West Bengal Police seized 41 crude bombs in Bhangar.
During the third phase of polling (6 April), Sujata Mondal, TMC candidate in Arambag, was attacked by some goons at Arandi-I booth 263.
During the third phase of polling, electronic voting machines and VVPAT machines were found in the house of a TMC politician of North Uluberia. The sector officer was later suspended.
The TMC accused the BJP of distributing cash coupons among people to lure them to attend Modi's rally.
In the fourth phase of polling, there were two major instances of violence, both in the Sitalkuchi constituency of the Cooch Behar district. In Pathantuli, a first-time voter, Ananda Barman, was shot and killed by unknown assailants after casting his vote. Both BJP and TMC claimed he was one of their workers, but family members said he was a belonged to BJP. In Sitalkuchi, CISF personnel who were guarding a polling station in Jorepatki shot and killed four Muslim villagers, who they alleged were part of a mob attacking them. They claimed the mob attacked them over rumours the security forces had thrashed a local boy and they fired in self-defence. The families of the deceased cliamed the firing was deliberate, and that they were in a queue to vote. Media staff found video footage from local sources, but Special Police Observer Vivek Dubey called it fake without citing any proper reason.
On 8 April the ECI issued a notice to Adhikari for communal overtones in his 29 March speech in Nandigram, where he derogatorily referred Mamata Banerjee (who is unmarried) as begum ("a married Muslim woman", thereby indicating that she was characterless). In his reply to the ECI notice, Adhikari claimed that he never made any personal attack or derogatory remarks against any political leader, but on 13 April, the ECI issued another warning to him for making derogatory statements in his speech.
On 12 April, the ECI imposed a 24-hour campaign ban on Mamata Banerjee (effective from 8 pm) for calling out female voters to gherao (or encircle) the CRPF, CAPF and CISF forces on election duty if they "created any obstruction in their right to vote" from a political rally in Cooch Behar district. The next day, the TMC Supremo staged a solitary dharna next to the statue of Mahatma Gandhi at the Mayo Road crossing in Kolkata to protest against the ECI's decision. On the same day, the ECI let Adhikari go with only a warning after he commented that voting in favour of Mamata Banerjee would convert West Bengal into a "mini-Pakistan", which led the TMC to allege that the ECI was operating in a biased manner to benefit BJP.
On 13 April, the ECI imposed a 48-hour campaign ban on former state BJP president Rahul Sinha for endorsing the killing of Muslims in the Sitalkuchi firing incident, and calling for more Muslims to be killed throughout the state in similar manner.
On the night before the fifth phase, a picture of the BJP candidate for Ranaghat having lunch with central forces spread on the internet.
In the fifth phase of polling, in the Shantinagar locality of Bidhannagar, bricks and stones were hurled between TMC and BJP booth workers, leaving eight people injured.
BJP candidate Gopal Chandra Saha was shot at while campaigning in Maldaha, and was admitted to a hospital.
In Jalpaiguri, after polling ended, four BJP agents were found with central force personnel carrying electronic voting machines.
On 24 April, Mamata Banerjee revealed details of the WhatsApp chat of an election observer employed by the ECI with BJP leaders, and said, "The Commission is instructing to arrest our party leaders before the [day of] election. I have WhatsApp chat of everything. Observers have spoken among themselves [about this]." She advised Anubrata Mandal, TMC's Birbhum district president, to go to the courts if the commission wrongfully keeps him under surveillance. The ECI put Mondal under "strict surveillance" for 62 hours from 5 pm on 27 April to 7 am on 30 April.)
On 29 April, during the eighth phase of voting, crude bombs were hurled near Mahajati Sadan in northern Kolkata.

Results
The election results for 292 constituencies was announced on 2 May 2021 after counting of votes began at 8:00 am (UTC+5:30), while the results for 2 constituencies was delayed until 3 October.

Declared on 2 May 2021:

! colspan="2" rowspan="2" |Parties and coalitions
! colspan="3" |Popular vote
! colspan="3" |Seats
|- valign="top"
! Votes
!%||±pp|| style="text-align:centre"|Contested || Won ||+/−
|-
| 
|All India Trinamool Congress (AITC) || style="text-align:right"|28,735,420
|47.94
||| 288 || 213
||
|-
| 
|Bharatiya Janata Party (BJP) || style="text-align:right"|22,850,710
||38.13
|||293||77
||74
|-
| 
| Communist Party of India (Marxist) (CPM) || style="text-align:right"|2,837,276
|style="text-align:right"|4.73||||style="text-align:centre"|138||style="text-align:centre"|0
||26
|-
| 
| Indian National Congress (INC) ||style="text-align:right"|1,757,131
|style="text-align:right"|2.93||||91|| 0
||44
|-
| 
|Indian Secular Front (ISF) ||style="text-align:right"|813,489
|style="text-align:right"|1.36
|||| 32||1
||1
|-
| 
|All India Forward Bloc (AIFB) ||style="text-align:right"|318,932
|style="text-align:right"|0.53
|||| 21||0
||3
|-
| 
|Revolutionary Socialist Party (RSP) ||style="text-align:right"|126,121
|style="text-align:right"|0.21
|||| 10||0
||2
|-
| 
|Communist Party Of India (CPI) ||style="text-align:right"|118,655
|style="text-align:right"|0.20
|||| 10||0
||1
|-
| 
|Gorkha Janmukti Morcha (GJM) (T) Faction
|style="text-align:right"|163,797
|style="text-align:right"|0.27
|
|3
|1
|1
|-
| 
|Gorkha Janmukti Morcha (GJM) (G) Faction
|style="text-align:right"|103,190
|style="text-align:right"|0.17
|
|3
|0
|3
|-
| 
|None of the above (NOTA)
|style="text-align:right"|646,828
|style="text-align:right"|1.08
|
| colspan="3" bgcolor="#E9E9E9" |
|-
|- class="unsortable" style="background-color:#E9E9E9"
! colspan="9" |
|-
| colspan="2" |Total||style="text-align:right"| 59,935,989
|100.0
| bgcolor="#E9E9E9" |
|
| 292 ||±0
|-
! colspan="9" |
|-
| style="text-align:left;" colspan="2" |Valid votes
| align="right" |59,935,989
| align="right" |99.84
| colspan="4" rowspan="5" style="background-color:#E9E9E9"  |
|-
| style="text-align:left;" colspan="2" |Invalid votes
| align="right" |96,674
| align="right" |0.16
|-
| style="text-align:left;" colspan="2" |Votes cast / turnout
| align="right" |60,032,663
| align="right" |82.32
|-
| style="text-align:left;" colspan="2" |Abstentions
| align="right" | 12,891,443
| align="right" |17.68
|-
| style="text-align:left;" colspan="2" |Registered voters
| align="right" | 72,924,106
|colspan="1" style="background-color:#E9E9E9"|
|-
|}

Declared on 3 October 2021:

! colspan="2" rowspan="3" |Political Parties
! colspan="4" |Results of remaining Constituencies(declared on 3 October)
! colspan="6" |Complete Results of 294 Constituencies
|-
! colspan="2" |Popular vote
! colspan="2" |Seats
! colspan="3" |Popular vote
! colspan="3" |Seats
|-
!Votes
!%
! Contested
!Won||Votes|| % || ±pp ||Contested ||Won ||+/−
|-
| 
|AITC
|style="text-align:right"|232,861
|60.19
|2
|2
| style="text-align:right"|28,968,281
|48.02
||| 290 || 215
||
|-
| 
|BJP
|style="text-align:right"|54,764
|14.16
|2
|0
| style="text-align:right"|22,905,474
||37.97
|||293||77
||
|-
| 
|CPI(M)
|style="text-align:right"|6,158
|1.59
|1
|0
| style="text-align:right"|2,843,434
|style="text-align:right"|4.71||||style="text-align:centre"|139||style="text-align:centre"|0
||26
|-
| 
|INC
|style="text-align:right"|70,038
|18.10
|1
|0
|style="text-align:right"|1,827,169
|style="text-align:right"|3.03||||92|| 0
||44
|-
| 
|RSP
|style="text-align:right"|9,067
|2.34
|1
|0
|style="text-align:right"|135,188
|style="text-align:right"|0.22
|||| 11||0
||2
|-
| 
|NOTA
|7,621
|1.97
| colspan="2" bgcolor="#E9E9E9" |
|style="text-align:right"|654,449
|style="text-align:right"|1.08
|
| colspan="3" bgcolor="#E9E9E9" |
|-
|- class="unsortable" style="background-color:#E9E9E9"
! colspan="12" |
|-
| colspan="2" |Total
|386,845
|100.00
| colspan="2" |2
|style="text-align:right"| 60,322,834
|100.00
| bgcolor="#E9E9E9" |
| colspan="3" | 294
|- class="unsortable" style="background-color:#E9E9E9"
! colspan="12" |
|-
| style="text-align:left;" colspan="2" |Valid votes
|386,845
|99.95
| colspan="2" rowspan="5" bgcolor="#E9E9E9" |
|style="text-align:right"| 60,322,834
|99.84
| colspan="4" rowspan="5" bgcolor="#E9E9E9" | 
|-
| style="text-align:left;" colspan="2" |Invalid votes
|183
|0.05
|96,857
|0.16
|-
| style="text-align:left;" colspan="2" |Votes cast / turnout
|387,028
|78.88
|60,419,691
|82.30
|-
| style="text-align:left;" colspan="2" |Abstentions
|103,614
|21.12
|12,995,057
|17.70
|-
| style="text-align:left;" colspan="2" |Registered voters
|490,642
|100.00
|73,414,748
|100.00
|-
|}

Alliance-wise results

Results by polling phase

Region-wise results

Constituency-wise results

No Vote To BJP campaign 
No Vote To BJP was a Anti-BJP political campaign in West Bengal. It was affiliated to the Communist Party of India (Marxist–Leninist) Liberation. The campaign motto was We requested to all peoples of the West Bengal, Vote For Anyone in the election, But Not vote for the BJP on the 2021 West Bengal Legislative Assembly election. The campaign was a major reason for the loss of the BJP in the 2021 West Bengal Legislative Assembly elections.

Controversies 
Communist Party of India (Marxist) supporters and leaders accused No Vote To BJP campaign and CPIML Liberation of leading to the victory of All India Trinamool Congress. Relations between CPIM and CPIML Liberation weakened after 2021 West Bengal Legislative Election.

Nandigram controversy 

On 18 January Mamata Banerjee announced at a rally in Nandigram that she would contest the upcoming assembly elections from Nandigram. Hours later, Suvendu Adhikari said he would defeat the CM by a margin of at least 50,000 votes or quit politics.

On the eve of polling in Nandigram, the ECI ordered the transfer of the sub-divisional police officer of Haldia and the circle inspector of Mahishadal in Purba Medinipur district to non-election assignments and imposed Section 144 in that constituency. A day after the polling, stray clashes took place between workers of the TMC and the BJP in some parts of Nandigram.

The votes were counted on 2 May. All eyes were set on the updates of high-voltage Nandigram constituency. 17 rounds of counting was to be done before declaring the winner. Mamata Banerjee was trailing in initial rounds. The EC informed that announcement of results for Nandigram would be delayed because of problem in server. In the 16th round, when the counting of votes in Gokulnagar panchayat area started, Mamata fell behind. After the 16th round, the counting of 17th round was delayed by an hour. Postal ballots were being counted at that time. At the end of the seventeenth round, it was announced that Mamata Banerjee had won by a margin of 1,200 (or 3,717) votes. Though later, it was declared that Suvendu had defeated (his) former party leader by approximately 1,956 votes. Mamata banerjee continued to claim that she won Nandigram, Security was beefed up in the vicinity of the Haldia counting centre amid fears of unrest.

Mamata Banerjee alleged that the returning officer of Nandigram constituency was threatened and the two observers sitting inside the counting centre were very biased.

The ECI wrote a letter to the West Bengal chief secretary and directed them to take all appropriate measures to keep a strict watch and regularly monitor the security provided to the returning officer in Nandigram.

Since Adhikari was declared winner, TMC workers protested outside the counting centre. Central Forces protected Adhikari's car while before it left the area. TMC workers alleged that the counting was stopped for three hours, the result was overturned after a power outage, and their agent was assaulted and thrown out from the counting centre by central forces.

On 14 July, the High Court issued a notice to Adhikari, the ECI, the state electoral officer, and the returning officer with a direction to keep all election-related records intact until the case was heard on 12 August. Adhikari went to the Supreme Court seeking transfer of Banerjee's election petition case outside the state.

On 12 August, Adhikari's lawyers submitted before the court of Justice Sarkar that the legislator has approached the Supreme Court seeking transfer of the case from West Bengal. In keeping with the respondent's prayer, Justice Sarkar adjourned the hearing to 15 November. On that date, Adhikari filed a petition in the Calcutta High Court seeking adjournment of the case. The High Court asked him to file a written statement explaining the reason for his no-confidence in the High Court by 29 November and it was decided that the next hearing would be held on 1 December.

Reactions and analysis 
For the first time since the creation of the state through division of Bengal Presidency, the state legislative assembly does not have any members from the INC or Left Front, who dominated and shaped the politics of the state until 1998 when the TMC was founded and overtook the INC as the main opposition party in the state.

Opinion polls and exit polls predicted a tight race between the TMC and BJP, and that TMC would win around 150 seats, BJP 140, with the remaining for Morcha. TMC won over 200 seats, while BJP overall performed poorly. According to many analysts the seats that the INC-Left Front alliance won in 2016 went to BJP, with TMC having an equal retention rate.

BJP's vote share fell from 40% in the 2019 elections to 38%. Reasons given were:
By fielding candidates who switched from TMC to BJP after the results of the 2019 general elections or months before the elections began, the party leadership angered the party at grassroots level who have been associated with the party since the 2014 general elections and have been actively demanding that the party remove those people from power, resulting in the defeat of 142 TMC turncoats who had been fielded by BJP as candidates in this election. The defeat of sitting TMC MLA Rabindranath Bhattacharjee, who had joined BJP on 8 March was significant because he lost in Singur, where people had started considering the 2006 anti-land acquisition movement led by Mamata Banerjee to be a historic blunder due to a lack of jobs in the region and had voted for BJP in the 2019 elections in the hopes of industrialisation. Similarly Rajib Banerjee, who won the Domjur seat by receiving more than 100,000 votes in the previous assembly election, lost by a margin of more than 42,000 votes because he was unable to consolidate the support of the local cadres from either TMC or BJP towards himself.
Derogatory comments made towards Mamata Banerjee by BJP leaders, notably Modi taunting her by calling her out as Didi, O Didi from political rallies in Howrah and Barasat, Adhikari referring to her as Begum and Ghosh calling her out as a 'bastard' & his derogatory comments on Mamata Banerjee's injury, eight months after a Dalit woman was gangraped and strangled to death by four upper-caste men in Uttar Pradesh and BJP leaders there openly supported of the perpetrators were not viewed positively by Bengali women. A large number of Bengali women (constituting 49% of the electorate) did not vote for BJP in spite of electoral promises.
Attempts made by BJP leaders to convert the tribal population into Hinduism were widely unpopular, especially in the tribal-dominated Medinipur division As a result, tribal votes were divided between BJP and TMC as TMC regained back the support of tribal communities in the Jhargram, Paschim Medinipur and Malda districts while BJP continued to retain its tribal votes in Purulia, Bankura, Jalpaiguri and Alipurduar.
 An increase in petrol, diesel and LPG prices along with spike in cases related to the COVID-19 pandemic during the elections and BJP's response to it made the party unpopular to the Bengali middle-class.
To compensate for the lack of organisational strength in the state, BJP depended heavily on non-Bengali leaders from the Hindi belt to campaign for the party. 52 Union Cabinet ministers and 17 senior BJP leaders, which included Yogi Adityanath, Shivraj Singh Chauhan, Gajendra Singh Shekhawat, Prahlad Patel, Sanjeev Balyan, Arjun Munda, Mansukh L. Mandaviya, Keshav Prasad Maurya, Narottam Mishra, Smriti Irani, Rajnath Singh, Dharmendra Pradhan, BJP party president J. P. Nadda, and secretary-in-charge of the state unit Kailash Vijayvargiya were sent to campaign in the state. Modi held 23 rallies, while Amit Shah held 79 in the state. The over-dependence of national leaders who did not speak Bangla created a communication gap between the party and the electorate, who viewed their Bengali identity to be losing ground in the state to the aggressive promotion of North Indian culture by the BJP.
Although the Matua community continued to vote in favour of BJP, they did not vote in unison as they did in the 2019 elections. Fears centering around the National Register of Citizens, frustration due to delay in implementation of the CAA, and Mamata Banerjee's attempts to regain back the support of the Matua community by allotting money for community-specific development of Namasudras and declaring the birthday of Harichand Thakur, founder of the Matua movement, as a state government holiday led to the division of Matua votes between the BJP and TMC to some extent, which affected the party in Nadia and North 24 Parganas districts as BJP won 28 Matua-dominated seats and TMC retained 21 Matua-dominated seats.

The TMC increased its vote share from 43% in 2019 elections to 48% in the election. Reasons given were:
After the debacle in the 2019 elections, Mamata Banerjee ordered her party to return the "cut-money" (money collected by extorting and accepting bribes from common people, in order to "allow" them to access government facilities).
To tone down the allegations of Muslim appeasement made against her, Mamata Banerjee declared an allowance for Hindu priests, providing 50,000 INR to each Durga Puja committee in the state, emphasising her Brahmin background and reciting shlokas from the Devi Mahatmya in political rallies.
The Didi Ke Bolo campaign launched by Prashant Kishor helped the electorate directly communicate with Mamata Banerjee and was widely popular in the state. The programs aimed to rebrand the public image of Mamata Banerjee from an arrogant pro-Muslim streetfighter prone to outbursts of anger to a down-to-earth leader who represents Bengali cultural values on a national level.
To curb the influence of party cadres acting as middlemen between common people and government schemes, Mamata Banerjee launched government programs like Duare Sarkar and Paraye Paraye Somadhan which aimed to directly deliver welfare schemes run by the state government to the public, and were well received.
TMC countered BJP's campaign of polarisation on religious grounds based on aggressive propagation of Hindutva by labelling the BJP as a party of non-Bengalis who were importing an alien culture in the state and portraying Mamata Banerjee as the defendant of Bengali identity in the face of Hindutva through its official election slogan "Bangla nijer meyekei chay"
Mamata Banerjee's decision to contest the elections only from Nandigram instead of Bhabanipur motivated her party cadres demoralised by the rise of BJP in 2019 and the ensuing defection of many top TMC leaders, to dedicate themselves entirely in preventing the BJP from coming into power in the state. Modi, Shah, and an entire hoard of high-profile leaders of national politics campaigned to remove Mamata Banerjee from power with the ECI acting biasedly in favour of the BJP and that she was campaigning from a wheelchair, solidified Mamata Banerjee's image in public perception as a fighter who is unwilling to give up without a fight. The TMC utilised this indomitable fighter spirit of her through its unofficial election anthem "Khela Hobe", which was later gave rise to the slogan "Bhanga Paye Khela Hobe".
Welfare schemes implemented by Mamata Banerjee like Kanyashree were already popular among the masses. They were combined by other populist schemes in the list of electoral promises, most notably Lakshmir Bhandar (basic income support for unemployed women).
BJP's endorsement of the killing of Muslims in the Sitalkuchi firing incident left the Bengali Muslim community of the state (who constitute 30% of the electorate) fearful for their existence and security in the scenario of a BJP-ruled West Bengal, and they voted for the TMC in the election.

The combined vote share of INC and Left Front fell from 11% in the 2019 general elections to 8% in this elections. Reasons given were:
Confusion regarding the party's policy was an important factor. Central INC leaders like Rahul Gandhi refrained from campaigning against Mamata Banerjee as the party enjoyed cooperation with the TMC at a national level, but at the state level PCC chief Adhir Ranjan Chowdhury refused to cooperate with TMC, and INC leaders found it difficult to justfy their alliance with the Left Front in West Bengal while opposing the Left Front in Kerala at the same time. The Left Front was divided over whether to consider BJP to be a greater threat than the TMC, and decided to focus more on opposing TMC than the BJP. This strategy backfired on the Left Front as the TMC portrayed itself as the party that could withstand BJP in the state, and the Left Front was viewed as a "vote-cutter" that divided the anti-BJP votes to BJP's advantage. A group of voters who had voted for the Left Front in the 2019 general elections voted for the TMC to prevent BJP from coming into power.
 To attract the anti-TMC and anti-BJP votes towards itself, the Sanyukta Morcha tried to portray BJP and TMC to be the same: both parties harboured corrupt leaders and engaged in identity politics. The INC's official election slogan was "Aar kono bhul na, aar kono phul na" ("No More Mistakes, No More Flowers", referring to the election symbols of BJP and TMC). The Left Front also criticised both the parties in social media under the term Bijemool (portmanteau of the words BJP and Trinamool). This didn't catch on with the electorate, who saw BJP as a Hindu right-wing party and TMC as a center-left party.
In spite of fielding Hindu candidates in the seats it had, public perception about ISF remained to be of a party by and for Muslims led by a hardliner cleric, Abbas Siddiqui, who had compared actress and TMC MP Nusrat Jahan to a prostitute in one of his apolitical jalsas in the past), and the alliance between them and Peerzada of Furfura Sharif was met with unease within the INC. The alliance with ISF wasn't appreciated by the Left Front workers at the grassroots level. 
The inability of aged leaders at the top of Left Front to adapt to changed conditions in state politics has also been cited as a reason.
In spite of mobilising huge amounts of crowds in the first rally of the Sanyukta Morcha at the Brigade Parade grounds before the elections began, ISF failed to divide the Muslim votes between itself and TMC in Presidency division and Burdwan division as expected in the aftermath of the Sitalkuchi shooting incident. The victory ISF's lone winning candidate (Abbas's brother Nowshad Siddiqui) in Bhangar has been credited to Arabul Islam's dissatisfaction for not being fielded as the candidate and the resulting non-cooperation with the district TMC leadership.

Veteran BJP leader Tathagata Roy lashed out at the party leadership on Twitter for viewing the ground conditions in the state through what he called KDSA (i.e. Kailash Vijayvargiya, Dilip ghosh, Shiv Prakash and Arvind Menon) and questioned the party's decision to field Nogorer notis, referring to actresses Payel Sarkar, Tanushree Chakraborty and Srabanti Chatterjee, who were seen in a boat ride with TMC leader Madan Mitra in the past. His Nogorer Noti remark drew widespread criticism online.

The average winning margin of all the candidates in this election stood at 26,964 votes, while the same for AITC candidates was 31,760 votes. This loss was stated by the media to be Modi's personal failure.

In view of the popular slogan "Khela Hobe", Mamata Banerjee declared that her party would observe 16 August as Khela Hobe Divas, which the BJP tried to link with Direct Action Day. She also launched a government scheme named "Khela Hobe" which granted 5,00,000 INR and free footballs among 25,000 sporting clubs in the state to promote sports in economically poorer sections of society.

Countering Shah's claim that BJP would come to power in West Bengal by winning around 200 or more seats out of the 294 seats in the state legislative assembly, Kishor publicly declared that he would resign from his job if BJP managed to win more than a 100 seats in this elections. Although he delivered his promise, Kishor declared his retirement from on being an election strategist on 2 May, citing personal reasons.

Aftermath

Violence 

After results were announced, post-poll violence broke out in some areas of the state. In reality it was continuation of the violence which took place across the state during the election. In recent times, the first occurrence of post-poll violence in the state was recorded in 2019 when BJP members targeted TMC staff and forcibly occupied or vandalised local TMC offices, mainly at the behest of the newly elected Barrackpore MP Arjun Singh.

On May 2, the results had just started showing signs of Trinamool returning to power when the men arrived, going house to house, ransacking them, breaking some. By the end of the day, 40 families of a colony located on KPC Medical College grounds in Jadavpur had fled. All BJP supporters or workers say TMC threats had kept them away for two-and-a-half months .

Government formation 
Mamata Banerjee took an oath as the Chief Minister of West Bengal for the third time on 5 May 2021 at the Raj Bhawan in Kolkata. She expanded the cabinet on 10 May 2021 when 43 TMC leaders were sworn in as ministers. 17 new people were in the Third Banerjee ministry.

Vacant seats 

TMC candidate Kajal Sinha from Khardaha died from COVID-19 after polling but before the results of the state assembly elections were announced, in which he emerged victorious. The ECI deferred the elections to two assembly seats in West Bengal in view of the COVID-19 pandemic. The polling had been rescheduled earlier to 16 May 2021 due to the death of two contestants from the Samserganj and Jangipur constituencies. Mocking this decision, the TMC said "The Election Commission, though late, finally woke up. But when demands were made repeatedly to arrange the election in one day by combining 2–3 phases, then they remained silent." Two BJP MLAs – Nisith Pramanik from Dinhata and Jaganath Sarkar from Shantipur constituencies – resigned after the election results, as they were sitting MPs from Cooch Behar and Ranaghat, respectively, and wanted to continue as MPs. Jayanta Naskar, TMC MLA of Gosaba, died from COVID-19 on 19 June after testing negative for the disease.

Appointments 
Adhikari, with the support of 22 MLAs, was elected as Leader of Opposition in the West Bengal Legislative Assembly on 10 May 2021.

BJP MPs Subhash Sarkar from Bankura, John Barla from Alipurduar, Nisith Pramanik from Coochbehar, and Shantanu Thakur from Bangaon were made ministers-of-state in the Union Caninet after the polls.

Incumbent Cabinet ministers from the state, Babul Supriyo from Asansol and Debasree Chaudhuri from Raiganj, resigned from their positions due to their failure in rallying the voters from their respective constituencies to vote for BJP. After the Cabinet reshuffle, Supriyo stated that he was quitting politics and his position as an MP, but after meeting the leaders of BJP, he decided to retain his position as an MP. He later joined TMC, stating that he wanted to remain in politics but his political participation was being restricted by BJP due to his defeat from Tollyganj and the party's poor performance in Asanol.

Abhishek Banerjee was promoted from the president of state TMC's youth wing to all-India general secretary.

Long time RSS activist and Balurghat MP Sukanta Majumdar succeeded Dilip Ghosh as the president of the state BJP unit, while Ghosh was made one of the national vice-presidents of the party.

Defections 
The Union Home Ministry decided to provide Y+ category security to Sisir Adhikari and his son Dibyendu Adhikari.

East Bardhaman MP Sunil Mondal, who had earlier defected from TMC to BJP alongside Adhikari in 2020, declared in August that he was "always with the TMC".

Adhikari demanded that the speaker Biman Banerjee dismiss Mukul Roy from the legislative assembly according to the anti-defection law, but TMC stated if Adhikari's father Sisir Adhikari can remain the MP from Kanthi even after switching from TMC to BJP in early 2021, then why Roy should be allowed to as well.

Four other MLAs – Soumen Roy from Kaliaganj, Biswajit Das from Bagda, Tanmoy Ghosh from Bishnupur and Krishna Kalyani from Raiganj switched from BJP to TMC following Roy without being disqualified from their membership.
All-India president of Congress's women's wing and its national spokesperson and former Silchar MP Sushmita Dev joined TMC, and was followed by Luizinho Faleiro.

After joining TMC, Supriyo resigned as MP on 19 October.

Two senior Congress leaders of Uttar Pradesh, Rajeshpati Tripathi and Laliteshpati Tripathi, grandson and great-grandson of former UP Chief Minister Kamalapati Tripathi, respectively, joined TMC.

2021 by-polls

The ECI deferred the elections in Samserganj and Jangipur constituencies due to the death of two candidates.

AITC MLA Sovandeb Chattopadhyay from Bhabanipur resigned after the election to allow Mamata Banerjee to contest a by-election in the constituency.

In the beginning of September, the ECI announced that general elections for Jangipur and Samserganj assembly seats and by-election for Bhabanipur seat would be held on 30 September and votes would be counted on 3 October. The time limit for filing nominations was set from 6 September until 13 September for Bhabanipur only. Mamata Banerjee filed hers on 10 September. A total of 12 candidates contested in Bhabanipur by-poll. Kishor enrolled himself as a voter from Bhabanipur, but he did not cast his vote.

A total of 52 central forces companies were deployed to the three poll-bound Assembly constituencies' booths. Section 144 was enforced in Bhabanipur on 28 September. On the eve of polling, the Commission deployed an additional 20 companies of central forces in Bhabanipur.

On 28 September, the ECI announced that remaining by-polls would be held on 30 October and votes counted on 2 November.

On 30 September the first report of violence came from Samserganj, and Congress candidate Jaidur Rahaman was accused of carrying out a bombing in this constituency. TMC activists raised "go back" slogans surrounding him while he inspected booths on polling day. Central forces were accused of kicking TMC leader Habibur Rahman, the outgoing councilor of Ward 20 of Dhulian Municipality under Samserganj Assembly. Priyanka Tibrewal, BJP candidate of Bhabanipur, was accused of violating the ECI's model code of conduct by travelling across the area with many cars and people at once. After she claimed to have caught fake voters, Firhad Hakim pointed out that as a candidate she had no right to check their identities. BJP leader Kalyan Chaubey's car was allegedly vandalised in Bhabanipur and BJP blamed TMC for the act. Police released CCTV footage of the incident, claiming it had nothing to do with politics. BJP claimed that Chaubey was their candidate's election agent but according to Commission sources, he was the agent of a Hindustani Awam Morcha candidate. The vehicle he used to get to the polling constituency was not registered by the EC. BJP lodged a total of 23 complaints against TMC over the voting process in Bhabanipur, but the ECI dismissed all of them. A total of 697,164 voters were eligible to cast their votes in the three constituencies. The voter turnout for Samserganj, Jangipur, and Bhabanipur was recorded at 79.92%, 77.63%, and 57.09% respectively.

Results were announced on 3 October, with TMC winning the three seats. Mamata Banerjee won the Bhabanipur Assembly seat by a margin of 58,835 votes over the BJP candidate. TMC led in all wards of Bhabanipur, including wards 70 and 74, where BJP led in the last assembly polls. On the same day, TMC officially announced a list of candidates for upcoming assembly by-elections to four seats.

The Model Code of Conduct was imposed in Nadia, Cooch Behar, Khardaha, and Gosaba. The ECI initially deployed 27 companies of central forces for the remaining by-elections. A week before the by-elections, an additional 53 companies entered the state. Later, the ECI decided to deploy a total of 92 CAPF companies.

On the last day of the Dinhata by-election campaign, Dilip Ghosh and Sukanta Majumdar met the deputy inspector general of police, Shailendra Kumar Singh, at the Border Security Force sector headquarters of Sonari in Cooch Behar. This was controversial because the Chief Minister could not even hold administrative meetings with Cooch Behar district officials, as the model code of conduct was in effect. Reacting to this, Hakim said "Recently, the Ministry of Home Affairs has increased the jurisdiction of BSF to 50 km. Taking advantage of this, the BJP leaders went to pull the BSF chief over to their side." TMC lodged a complaint with the ECI. A TMC deputy went to the district magistrate's chamber and complained that the BSF-BJP meeting had violated the model code of conduct.

On polling day, central forces were accused of intimidating voters at booth 296 in Dinhata and some other booths in Kharadaha and Gosaba. In Kharadha, the central forces prevented TMC candidate Sovandeb Chattopadhyay from entering a booth, who alleged that they unfairly demanded to see double vaccination certificates from voters. The problem was resolved after informing the matter to the presiding officer. During the election campaign, Joy Saha, BJP candidate of Khardaha, used a picture of the deceased TMC leader Kajal Sinha in his campaign. On election day, he claimed to have caught two fake voters red-handed, which was proven false. When he claimed to have caught a fake voter and BJP supporters started harassing the man, a fight broke out between the TMC and the BJP over the incident. Joy Saha's personal security guards baton charged TMC activists, injuring the Sinha's son in the process. Gosaba registered highest voter turnout among four constituencies.

The results of the four constituencies was announced on 2 November, with TMC winning all seats. TMC's Sovandeb Chattopadhyay and Subrata Mondal won Khardaha and Gosaba, respectively, by huge margins. Udayan Guha, who lost the Dinhata seat by a margin of 57 votes during the assembly election, won the seat in the bypolls by a margin of 164,089 votes. TMC also won the Santipur seat, where Braja Kishor Goswami was the TMC candidate, from the BJP by a considerable margin of votes.

See also 
 2016–21 West Bengal Legislative Assembly by-elections
 2016 West Bengal Legislative Assembly election
 2018 West Bengal Panchayat elections
 2019 Indian general election in West Bengal
 2021 West Bengal Legislative Assembly by-elections
 2021 Kolkata Municipal Corporation election
 2021 elections in India

References

Notes

Citations

Further reading

External links
 West Bengal General Legislative Election at the Election Commission of India

2021 West Bengal Legislative Assembly election
West Bangal
2021
2020s in West Bengal